Bruno Cetto, (1921-1991) born in Trento, Italy was an Italian engineer and mycologist. He is noted for writing a seminal, seven-volume series of books on mushrooms in Italian, I Funghi dal Vero.

Legacy
Several Italian mycological events have been named after him, including a mycological Italian association/club. His hometown named a street after him.

References

1921 births
1991 deaths
20th-century Italian engineers
Italian mycologists